Cramoisy is a commune in the Oise department in northern France. Cramoisy station has rail connections to Beauvais and Creil.

See also
Communes of the Oise department

References

Communes of Oise